The  is a Japanese clan which claims descent from Emperor Seiwa, and is a branch of the Minamoto clan. They were famous for their role as retainers of the Takeda clan in the 16th century. In the Edo period, the clan produced two daimyō families: one ruling the Aizu domain, the other one ruling the Iino Domain. The Aizu-Matsudaira were descended from Hoshina Masayuki, a son of Tokugawa Hidetada, adopted by Hoshina Masamitsu.

Matsudaira Katamori and Hoshina Masaari, two prominent figures of the Bakumatsu period, were members of the Hoshina clan.

Family head
 Hoshina Tadanaga
 Hoshina Naganao
 Hoshina Nagatoki
 Hoshina Mitsutoshi
 Hoshina Masatomo
 Hoshina Masatoshi
 Hoshina Masanori
 Hoshina Masatoshi
 Hoshina Masanao
 Hoshina Masamitsu
 Hoshina Masayuki
 Hoshina Masatsune (1647–1681)
 Hoshina Masakata (1665–1715)
 Hoshina Masataka (1694–1738)
 Hoshina Masahisa (1704–1739)
 Hoshina Masanori (1752–1815)
 Hoshina Masayoshi (1775–1844)
 Hoshina Masamoto (1801–1848)
 Hoshina Masaari
 Hoshina Masaaki
 Hoshina Mitsumasa
 Hoshina Masaoki
 Hoshina Masanobu

References
  Hoshina history on Harimaya.com

 
Japanese clans
Meiji Restoration